Herbert Bösch (born September 11, 1954 in Feldkirch, Vorarlberg) is an Austrian politician who served as a Member of the European Parliament (MEP) from 1995 until 2009.

Early life and career
Bösch studied sociology and politology at the University of Konstanz. After finishing his studies he was employed in the administration of the federal state capital Bregenz.

Political career
From 1989 to 1994 Bösch served as Member of the Federal Council of Austria (Bundesrat) for the Social Democratic Party of Austria (SPÖ), then Member of the National Council of Austria (Nationalrat) until he became MEP.
 
In the European Parliament, Bösch was a member of the Committee on Budgets from 1995 until 1999. In 1997, he joined the Committee on Budgetary Control, which he chaired from 2007 until 2009. In the 2009 elections, he failed to win re-election.

Other activities
 European Anti-Fraud Office (OLAF), Member of the Supervisory Committee (2012-2015)

Personal life
Bösch is married and has three children.

Notes and references 

1954 births
Living people
People from Feldkirch, Vorarlberg
Austrian political scientists
Social Democratic Party of Austria MEPs
MEPs for Austria 1999–2004
MEPs for Austria 2004–2009